Institute For American Indian Studies (IAIS) is a museum and research center in Washington, Connecticut. It is dedicated to preserving and sharing the culture and history of Native American peoples, particularly those from the Northeastern Woodlands. Exhibits include a replica Algonkian village, and nature trails and a garden with plants used by native peoples. The museum opened on July 1, 1975, as the American Indian Archaeological Institute and changed to the present name in 1991.

References

External links 

 Official website

Native American museums in Connecticut
501(c)(3) organizations